Thryssocypris smaragdinus is a species of cyprinid of the genus Thryssocypris. It inhabits western Borneo in Indonesia. It has not been evaluated on the IUCN Red List, was described in 1984 and is considered harmless to humans. It has 9 to 10 dorsal soft rays, 12 to 14 anal soft rays and 38 to 39 vertebrae.

References

Cyprinid fish of Asia
Freshwater fish of Indonesia
Fish described in 1984